The 1994–95 Iowa Hawkeyes men's basketball team represented the University of Iowa as members of the Big Ten Conference during the 1994–95 NCAA Division I men's basketball season. The team was led by head coach ninth-year head coach Tom Davis, and played their home games at Carver-Hawkeye Arena. They finished the season 21–12 overall and 9–9 in Big Ten play.

Roster

Schedule/Results

|-
!colspan=8 style=| Non-Conference Regular Season
|-

|-
!colspan=8 style=| Big Ten Regular Season
|-

|-
!colspan=8 style=| National Invitation Tournament

Rankings

References

Iowa Hawkeyes men's basketball seasons
Iowa
Iowa
1994 in sports in Iowa
1995 in sports in Iowa